Hukam Singh may refer to:

 Hukam Singh (Haryana politician) (1925–2015) also known as Chaudhari Hukam Singh
 Hukam Singh (Punjab politician) (1895–1983) also known as Sardar Hukam Singh

See also
 Hakam Singh (?–2018), former Indian athlete
 Hukum Singh (1938–2018), Indian politician
 Rao Raja Hukum Singh Rathore (1951–1984), son of Maharaja Hanwant Singh, also known as Tutu Bana